Seconds to Spare, also known as Operation Wolverine: Seconds to Spare, is a 2002 thriller about a hijacked train. Directed by  Brian Trenchard-Smith, it was shot in Australia and stars Antonio Sabato Jr, Kimberley Davies, Kate Beahan, Nick Tate, and Charlotte Gregg.

References

External links

2002 films
2002 action thriller films
Australian television films
Australian action adventure films
American action adventure films
Films scored by Guy Gross
Action television films
American thriller television films
Films directed by Brian Trenchard-Smith
2000s American films
2000s Australian films